The Standard are an American indie rock band from Portland, Oregon.

History
The Standard formed in Portland in 1999 out of members who had all previously played in Portland indie groups. The group signed with Touch and Go Records in 2002 for one release, and had two releases on Yep Roc in 2004–05. In 2008, they released their last album Swimmer on Partisan Records, a label co-founded by Tim Putnam.

Members
Tim Putnam – vocals, guitar
Jay Clarke – keyboards
Rob Oberdorfer – bass
Rob Duncan – drums

Discography
The Standard (Barbaric Records, 2001)
August (Touch and Go Records, 2002)
Wire Post to Wire (Yep Roc, 2004)
Albatross (Yep Roc, 2005)
Swimmer (Partisan Records, 2008)

References

Indie rock musical groups from Oregon
Musical groups from Portland, Oregon
Touch and Go Records artists
1999 establishments in Oregon
Musical groups established in 1999